Erik Peters, F.C.A., served as Auditor General of Ontario between 1993 and 2003.

References
 Canadian Who's Who 1997 entry
 Auditor General of Ontario biography

Year of birth missing (living people)
Living people
Canadian accountants
Ontario civil servants
Place of birth missing (living people)
Canadian auditors
20th-century Canadian people